Walter Charles Pearce (29 April 1870 – 20 March 1951) was a New Zealand cricketer who played first-class cricket for Canterbury from 1894 to 1903 and represented New Zealand in the days before New Zealand played Test cricket. 

Wally Pearce was a pace bowler who generated considerable pace from a short run-up and bowled an effective yorker, and a hard-hitting batsman with a crouching, ungainly style. He played an important part in New Zealand's first victory. In the match against the touring New South Wales team in 1895-96 he scored 47 in each innings, hitting out effectively after New Zealand were in trouble in the second innings, and took four wickets.

Pearce married Marion Wyatt in Christchurch on 21 December 1898. She died on 14 January 1943. They had two daughters.

References

External links
 
 

1870 births
1951 deaths
New Zealand cricketers
Pre-1930 New Zealand representative cricketers
Canterbury cricketers
Cricketers from Christchurch